The Fajardo Soccer Stadium is a 4,000-seat association football stadium in Fajardo, Puerto Rico. As of the 2018-19 Liga Puerto Rico season, it hosts the home matches of Puerto Rico Sol FC.

References

External links
Facebook

Football venues in Puerto Rico